Bennane-Bodher is a municipality in Monastir Governorate, Tunisia.

References

Populated places in Monastir Governorate